Charlotte Witthauer (1915–1980) was a German film actress.

Filmography

References

Bibliography 
 Noack, Frank. Veit Harlan: The Life and Work of a Nazi Filmmaker. University Press of Kentucky, 2016.

External links 
 

1915 births
1980 deaths
German film actresses
Actors from Wrocław